Mill Point Federal Prison was a minimum security United States federal prison camp located west of Mill Point in Pocahontas County, West Virginia.  It was built on a plot in Monongahela National Forest adjacent to the Cranberry Glades.  In operation from 1938 to 1959, all buildings were demolished after its closure.

Notable inmates
 Howard Fast, novelist

References

Pocahontas County, West Virginia
Monongahela National Forest
Defunct prisons in West Virginia
1938 establishments in West Virginia
1959 disestablishments in West Virginia